Kenneth Ernest Leonard Groves (9 October 1921 – May 2002) was an English professional football goalkeeper who played in the Football League for Reading.

References 

English footballers
English Football League players
Association football goalkeepers
Brentford F.C. wartime guest players
Reading F.C. players
1921 births
2002 deaths
People from Eton, Berkshire
Windsor & Eton F.C. players
Preston North End F.C. players